Etrian Odyssey Untold: The Millennium Girl is a 2013 role-playing video game for the Nintendo 3DS by Atlus. It is part of the Etrian Odyssey series, and is both a "reimagining" and a remake of the first entry. It was released by Atlus in 2013 for Japan on June 27 and in North America on October 1 and released by NIS America in Europe on May 2, 2014. It is available via both Nintendo eShop and retail at release.

Gameplay
The game was the first in the series to contain two modes, Classic and Story. Classic mode is the same as other entries, with custom characters and maps. The new Story mode is similar to other RPG series, with an expansive story, preset characters, cutscenes and voice acting, but the players will have to draw their own dungeon maps just like in Classic Mode. The game also contains three difficulty settings: Picnic, which allows for easy gameplay; Normal, which allows for moderately difficult but manageable gameplay; and Expert, which allows for the toughest gameplay possible.

Characters
Story Mode has five playable characters available to the player:

Highlander: The player's avatar and first introduced character: a young man who is dispatched to Etria to investigate the cause of earthquakes that have been troubling the town lately.

Frederica "Ricky" Irving: A mysterious 18-year-old girl the Highlander meets in the ruins of Gladsheim. In the beginning she has no memories due to being frozen for a thousand years in the past, but regains them later on.

Simon Yorke: A 24-year-old researcher who works for the Midgard Library. He is a calm and pragmatic thinker who leads the Midgard Library's investigation team composed of himself, Arthur and Raquna, but not the guild when it is formed.

Arthur Clarke: An orphaned 14-year-old boy who works for the Midgard Library. An energetic and mischievous youth who idolizes Simon and sees him as an older brother.

Raquna Sheldon: A 20-year-old girl descended from the nobility of the distant city of Ontario. She has a hedonistic side, but is also honest and loyal. She was originally to be the leader of the Midgard Library's investigation team, but she refused the position.

Reception

Critical reception for Etrian Odyssey Untold: The Millennium Girl has been positive, with Famitsu giving the game an overall score of 36/40.

Etrian Odyssey Untold sold 90,297 copies in its first week of release in Japan. As of July 2013, the game has sold more than 114,000 copies worldwide.

Notes

References

External links

2013 video games
Fantasy video games
Atlus games
First-person party-based dungeon crawler video games
1 Untold The Millennium Girl
Nintendo 3DS games
Nintendo 3DS eShop games
Nintendo 3DS-only games
Role-playing video games
Video game remakes
Video games scored by Yuzo Koshiro
Video games developed in Japan
Video games featuring protagonists of selectable gender